James O'Connell may refer to:

 Sir James O'Connell, 1st Baronet (1786–1872), Irish baronet
 James Dunne O'Connell (1899–1984), American army general, chief of Signal Corps
 James O'Connell (athlete) (1882–1942), American Olympic athlete
 James F. O'Connell, professor of anthropology
 James T. O'Connell, American businessman and government official

See also
 Jimmy O'Connell (disambiguation)
 James Connell (disambiguation)